Herzhorn is a municipality in the district of Steinburg, in Schleswig-Holstein, Germany. It is situated near the river Elbe, approx. 4 km east of Glückstadt, and 15 km south of Itzehoe.

Herzhorn was the seat of the former Amt ("collective municipality") Herzhorn.

References

Steinburg